Friday Night Plans is a musical act led by Japanese vocalist Masumi (born January 1996), who is the group's sole member. Debuting in 2017 as a featured vocalist in a collaboration between StarRo and AmPm, Friday Night Plans solo debuted in 2018, primarily collaborating with drummer and producer Tepppei. Friday Night Plans is best known for covering Mariya Takeuchi's "Plastic Love" in 2018, and her song "Honda", which was used in commercials for Honda Vezel cars in Japan in 2019.

Biography 

Masumi was born in Tokyo to a Japanese father and Filipina mother. She spent most of her childhood in Tokyo, only visiting the Philippines once every few years. Masumi wanted to become a singer after listening to her mother singing Mariah Carey and Whitney Houston songs, and became interested in Western music in junior high school, especially after watching MTV Japan every day and becoming a fan of Justin Bieber. Masumi began attending a vocal training school in high school.

Masumi was discovered on Instagram by Japanese singer Taichi Mukai around June 2017, who liked her cover song performances she had posted. This led to Masumi being scouted to sing on a collaborative song between producer StarRo and electronic duo AmPm entitled "Maybe", which was released in November 2017. Without having a stage name before the song's release, Masumi decided to go with Friday Night Plans, reminding herself of the feeling of excitement in her childhood making plans with friends (and wanting the name to evoke excitement in listeners).

Masumi met producer and drummer Tepppei in March 2018 after a suggestion by her record label director, and in July 2018 Friday Night Plans released their first single, "Happy Birthday", produced by Tepppei. The pair worked together for much of 2018 and 2019, including on the project's cover of Mariya Takeuchi's "Plastic Love" (2018), which became one of the project's most popular songs, and the Complex EP released in November 2019, which was entirely produced by Tepppei. Outside of this, Friday Night Plans released Location: Los Angeles in August 2018, a collection of demos not produced by Tepppei, which were recorded by Masumi during a trip to Los Angeles in June.

In 2019, Friday Night Plans released the song "Honda", a song used in commercials for Honda Vezel, which became the act's first single to chart on the Billboard Japan Hot 100 chart. This, along with her follow-up single "Unknown" were produced by Dr. Pay.

Artistry 

Friday Night Plans' music has a wide range of influences, including Justin Bieber, Nigerian-Canadian musician Odie, and Korean R&B singer-songwriter Dean.

Discography

Extended plays

Singles

As lead artist

As featured artist

Guest appearances

Notes

References

External links 

 Friday Night Plans (@hithisisfnp) on Twitter
 Friday Night Plans on Instagram

1996 births
21st-century Japanese singers
21st-century Japanese women singers
English-language singers from Japan
Japanese women singer-songwriters
Japanese singer-songwriters
Japanese-language singers
Japanese people of Filipino descent
Living people
Musicians from Tokyo